I'll Need Someone to Hold Me When I Cry is a studio album by American country artist Janie Fricke. It was released in November 1980 via Columbia Records and contained ten tracks. The disc was a collection of more traditional country songs, a style that Fricke began adapting to after taking a suggestion from a former record producer. It was the fifth studio album issued in Fricke's career and spawned three singles. Both the title track and "Down to My Last Broken Heart" became top five charting singles in the United States. A cover of the song "Pride" reached the top 20.

Background and content
Janie Fricke had been signed as a recording artist to Columbia Records since 1977 but had yet to have a top ten hit. Former producer Billy Sherrill encouraged her to focus on one particular musical style, so Fricke began recording ballads in the early 1980s. Fricke began recording alongside a new producer Jim Ed Norman who recorded next album in August 1980. The sessions were cut at the Audio Media Recorders studio, located in Nashville, Tennessee. I'll Need Someone to Hold Me When I Cry consisted of ten tracks. Three of the album's new songs were composed by Chick Rains. Along with several new recordings was a cover of Johnnie Ray's "Cry" and Ray Price's "Pride".

Release, chart performance and reception
I'll Need Someone to Hold Me When I Cry was originally released in November 1980 on Columbia Records. It was the fifth studio release in Fricke's recording career. It was originally offered as a vinyl LP and a cassette. Both formats had identical track listings. It was later released to digital and streaming sites including Apple Music. The album was Fricke's first to enter the American Billboard Top Country Albums chart. It spent a total of 21 weeks on the chart and peaked at number 28 by February 1981. The disc later received four out of five stars from AllMusic.

Singles
The disc spawned three singles, starting with "Down to My Last Broken Heart". It spent 18 weeks on the Billboard Hot Country Songs chart and peaked at number two in January 1981. It was Fricke's first solo single to reach the top ten. The second single released from the record was Fricke's cover of "Pride". Columbia released the single in February 1981. Spending 14 weeks on the country songs chart, "Pride" peaked at number 12 in May 1981. The final single released from the album was the title track. It was issued by Columbia in July 1981. After 18 weeks, the song peaked at number four on the Billboard country chart, becoming her second solo top ten single. Additionally, both "Pride" and the title track became Fricke's first singles to reach number one on Canada's RPM Country Songs chart. "Down to My Last Broken Heart" would reach number two.

Track listings

Original versions

Digital version

Personnel
All credits are adapted from the liner notes of I'll Need Someone to Hold Me When I Cry.

Musical personnel

 Eddie Bayers – drums
 Tom Brannon – backing vocals
 Dennis Burnside – piano
 Mark Casstevens – guitar
 Janie Fricke – lead vocals, backing vocals
 Sonny Garrish – steel guitar
 Lloyd Green – steel guitar
 Sheri Kramer – backing vocals

 Joe Osborn – bass
 Charlie McCoy – harmonica
 Bobby Ogdin – piano
 Ricky Skaggs – backing vocals, fiddle 
 Diane Tidwell – backing vocals
 Rafe Van Hoy – guitar
 Paul Worley – guitar

Technical personnel
 Shelly Kurland – concertmaster
 Jim Ed Norman – producer
 Bergen White – arrangements

Charts

Release history

References

1980 albums
Albums produced by Jim Ed Norman
Columbia Records albums
Janie Fricke albums